The current Minister of Foreign Affairs of Malaysia is Zambry Abdul Kadir, since 3 December 2022. The minister is supported by Deputy Minister of Foreign Affairs which is yet to be appointed. The minister administers the portfolio through the Ministry of Foreign Affairs.

List of ministers of foreign affairs
The following individuals have been appointed as Minister of Foreign Affairs, or any of its precedent titles:

Political Party:

List of ministers of external affairs
The following individuals have been appointed as Minister of Extetnal Affairs, or any of its precedent titles:

Political Party:

References

Ministry of Foreign Affairs (Malaysia)
Lists of government ministers of Malaysia